The San Diego Half Marathon may refer to:

Rock 'n' Roll San Diego Half Marathon
America's Finest City Half Marathon